Viktor Staal (17 February 1909 – 4 June 1982) was an Austrian film actor.

Selected filmography

 Everything for the Company (1935)
 Eva, the Factory Girl (1935)
 Das Einmaleins der Liebe (1935)
 The World's in Love (1935)
 Waltz Around the Stefanstower (1935)
 Donogoo Tonka (1936) - Pierre Lamendin
 Winter in the Woods (1936) - Walter Peters, Schriftsteller
 A Girl from the Chorus (1937) - Hans Reuter
 Ride to Freedom (1937) - Jan Wolski
 To New Shores (1937) - Henry Hoyer
 Diamonds (1937) - Piet Maartens
 A Night in May (1938) - Poldi Sonnleitner
 Capriccio (1938) - Fernand de Villeneuve
 Fortsetzung folgt (1938) - Viktor Bork - Schriftsteller
 Storms in May (1938) - Willy Prinz
 Women for Golden Hill (1938) - Douglas
 Detours to Happiness (1939) - Mathias Holberg
 The Right to Love (1939) - Vinzenz Brunner
 Verdacht auf Ursula (1939) - Klaus Ramin
 Twilight (1940) - Walter Gruber
 Liebesschule (1940) - Heinz Wölfing, Schriftsteller
 Wetterleuchten um Barbara (1941) - Anton Walcher
 Heimaterde (1941)
 The Great Love (1942) - Oberleutnant Paul Wendlandt
 Love Me (1942) - Andreas Rüdiger
 Du gehörst zu mir (1943) - Dr. Groone
  (1943) - Peter Niklas
 Nora (1944) - Dr. Robert Helmer
 Via Mala (1945) - Andreas von Richenau
 Between Yesterday and Tomorrow (1947) - Rolf Ebeling
 Verführte Hände (1949) - Gorg Reinhart
 Einmaleins der Ehe (1949) - Dr. Johannes Kellmann
  (1949) - Gidi
 Mathilde Möhring (1950) - Hugo Großmann
 Everything for the Company (1950) - Herr Knesing
 Trouble in Paradise (1950) - Hans Soltau
 Eine Frau mit Herz (1951)
 Das fremde Leben (1951) - Werftbesitzer Jürgen Fredersen
 Veronika the Maid (1951) - Richard
 Im Banne der Madonna (1951) - Michael Trautner
 The Last Shot (1951) - Thomas Scharrer
 House of Life (1952) - Willi Kuschitzky
 The Exchange (1952) - Simon Gigl
 When the Heath Dreams at Night (1952) - Karl Odewig
 Your Heart Is My Homeland (1953) - Karlheinz Reiling
 Aunt Jutta from Calcutta (1953) - Dr. Hans Hannemann, Rechtsanwalt / Lawyer
 The Postponed Wedding Night (1953) - Christian Möbius
 The Beginning Was Sin (1954) - Jacob, Bauer
 Hochstaplerin der Liebe (1954) - Ernest Harrington
The Blacksmith of St. Bartholomae (1955) - Thomas
 The Dark Star (1955) - Casseno
 Closed Exit (1955) - Juan
 The Mistress of Solderhof (1955) - Dr. Stefan Heim
 Regine (1956) - Friedrich Wentland
 Spy for Germany (1956) - Oberst Sommerfeld
  (1957) - Friedrich Harkort
 Wetterleuchten um Maria (1957) - Mayor
 The Fox of Paris (1957) - Col. Toller
 Taiga (1958) - Weber
 Der schwarze Blitz (1958) - Lehrer Thalhammer
  (1958) - Kara Ben Nemsi
 Hunting Party (1959) - Jakob Reinhard
 Wild Water (1962) - Förster Böhmel
 Trompeten der Liebe (1962) - Supt. Mank
 Die drei Scheinheiligen (1964) - Dr. Ebert
 Freddy, Tiere, Sensationen (1964) - Zirkusdirektor
 Help, I Love Twins (1969) - Dr. Peters
 The Hunter of Fall (1974) - Förster
 The Standard (1977) - Anton (final film role)

Television
 Quadrille (1961, TV Movie) - Axel Diensen
 Interpol (1963) - Arthur Redgrave
 Alarm in den Bergen (1965)
 Die Tintenfische (1966) - Dr. Hellerer
 Landarzt Dr. Brock (1967-1968) - Dr. Kurt Vielhaber
 Pater Brown (1972) - Oberst

References

External links
 

1909 births
1982 deaths
Austrian male film actors
People from Baja, Hungary
20th-century Austrian male actors